Marius George Pena (born 2 May 1985) is a Romanian former footballer who played as a forward.

He is the son of Gheorghe Pena, a striker who played in the 80's for Progresul București, Olt Scornicești and Steaua București.

Career
On 14 September 2011, he scored the equalizing goal in Galaţi's 2–1 loss to Basel in the 2011–12 UEFA Champions League group stage after chipping in cleverly a shot that Swiss goalkeeper spilled.

In August 2014, Pena signed a two-year contract with Concordia Chiajna.

Honours

FC Oțelul Galați
Liga I: 2010–11
Supercupa României: 2011

References

External links

1985 births
Living people
Footballers from Bucharest
Romanian footballers
Association football forwards
FC Progresul București players
SCM Râmnicu Vâlcea players
CS Concordia Chiajna players
ASC Oțelul Galați players
FC Baku players
Liga I players
Romanian expatriate footballers
Expatriate footballers in Azerbaijan
Romanian expatriate sportspeople in Azerbaijan
FC Torpedo Moscow players